WMCL (1060 AM) is a radio station licensed to McLeansboro, Illinois, United States.  The station is currently owned by Dana Communications Corporation.

1060 AM is a United States and Mexican clear-channel frequency.

References

External links
 Station website

 
 

MCL